Cambropachycope is a genus of small ( long) extinct Cambrian arthropods, known from the Orsten lagerstätten in southern Sweden. It appears to have several apomorphic features, notably including a single large compound eye.

Morphology 

The head of Cambropachycope have unusual anterior projection of the head that bears single large compound eye. Eye structure is well preserved, and it shows three layers in cornea, an outermost and innermost layer of transparent material and a hollow middle layer containing a dark material. Middle layer was probably used for  serving to filter out the blue, scattered light from sunlight. There are four pairs of appendages on its head. First pair of appendages is treated as antenna, and other appendages on head are biramous. Mouth opens on the ventral surface in front of the second pair of appendages. Abdomen have four segments with two pairs of paddle-shaped appendages, and telson.

Ecology 
According to its eye structure, Cambropachycope was probably a predator.

Classification 

It is hesitantly presumed to be an early offshoot under the clade Pancrustacea in original description. It consists of the species Cambropachycope clarksoni. Other organisms, including Henningsmoenia and Martinssonia also discovered in Orsten, may exist at a similar place on the phylogenetic tree. Collectively, this may have implications for the origins of the crustaceans. However, later study placed this genus outside Pancrustacea, and just treated as stem-group Mandibulata.

References

Cambrian animals
Prehistoric arthropod genera
Cambrian genus extinctions